Road to Life is a 1931 Soviet drama film written and directed by Nikolai Ekk. The film won an award at the 1932 Venice International Film Festival, which went to Ekk for Most Convincing Director.

It was the first sound film in the Soviet Union, and the first to be win a Best Director award at any film festival.

Plot summary 
In Moscow operates one of the countless gangs of street kids – Zhigan's gang. The boys who belong to it have been living on the street for a long time. In December 1923 police forces conduct a raid, and catch about a thousand homeless children. Almost all of them are distributed to orphanages. But there are several dozen minors who run away from all the orphanages to which they are sent. For example, Mustafa has escaped 8 times and had to be returned 15 times by the authorities. What is one supposed to do with them? This leads to a decision to send them over to a house of correction, that is, a prison for minors.

Sergeev offers another solution: to create a labor commune. The children will work as carpenters, shoemakers, carpenters, remain free citizens, they will feed themselves. But not with theft, instead with work ... Good intentions as always, are good only in theory. In practice, the former street kids do not immediately become honest hard workers ...

Cast 

 Nikolai Batalov - Nikolai Sergeiev
 Yvan Kyrlya - Dandy Mustapha
 Mikhail Dzhagofarov - Nikolai 'Kolka' Rebrov
 Aleksandr Novikov – Vaska Busa
 Mikhail Zharov – Fomka Zhigan
 Glikeriya Bogdanova-Chesnokova – a girl from a gang of Zhigan (not in the titles, the episode was cut and remains in the general plans only)
 Mariya Andropova as Maria Skriabina
 Vladimir Vesnovsky as Mr. Rebrov
 Mariya Gonfa as Lelka, aka 'Maziha'
 Bozhak Besprizornykh

Production 

The film was shot on the territory of the Bolshevskaya labor commune named after Genrikh Yagoda (established in February 1924). Several scenes were filmed on the territory of the Annunciation Monastery in Sarapul. The arrival of street children in the labor commune, as well as scenes of street rebellion, were all filmed in the village of Kolomenskoye. The Church of the Ascension in Kolomenskoye is also shown in the film.

This is the first appearance in film of actors Rina Zelyonaya and Georgiy Zhzhonov.

Old residents of the city of Dzerzhinsk (Lyuberetsky District) believe that the film tells the story of a labor commune located in the area of the Ugresha Monastery. They say that at Lyubertsy Dzerzhinsky on a single-track is a place where Zhigan killed Mustafa.

Awards 
The film's director Nikolai Ekk was named as the best director by a poll of viewers of the 1st Venice International Film Festival (1932).

Legacy 
While Genrikh Yagoda served as a comissar, Bolshevskaya commune being dedicated to him brought it certain advantages. After the arrest of Genrikh Yagoda in April 1937, the commune was broken and dispersed, Matvei Pogrebinsky shot himself, his books ("Factory of people", edited under Maxim Gorky, and others) were removed from libraries and destroyed. However, the film, due to its high international acclaim, was not withdrawn from circulation, but all mention of the commune itself were excised from the footage.

References

External links
 

1931 films
Gorky Film Studio films
1931 drama films
Soviet drama films
Soviet black-and-white films
Soviet teen films
Mari-language films